Mong Kok (also spelled Mongkok, often abbreviated as MK) is an area in Kowloon, Hong Kong. The Prince Edward subarea occupies the northern part of Mong Kok.

Mong Kok is one of the major shopping areas in Hong Kong. The area is characterised by a mixture of old and new multi-story buildings, with shops and restaurants at street level, and commercial or residential units above. Major industries in Mong Kok are retail, restaurants (including fast food) and entertainment. It has been described and portrayed in films as an area in which triads run bars, nightclubs, and massage parlours.

Name
Until 1930, the area was called Mong Kok Tsui (芒角嘴). The current English name is a transliteration of its older Chinese name 望角, or 芒角, which is named for its plentiful supply of ferns in the past when it was a coastal region. Its present Chinese name "旺角", means "prosperous corner" or "crowded corner", however, the English name did not change.

For a period, the area was also called Argyle, and this name was used for the MTR station when it opened in 1979. The office building , which was named after the area, is known in English as Argyle Centre rather than Mong Kok Centre.

Administration
Mong Kok is part of Yau Tsim Mong District. It was part of the Mong Kok District before the district was merged in 1994. The area belongs to the Kowloon West geographical constituency of the Legislative Council of Hong Kong.

History
Displays at the Chinese University of Hong Kong include antique potteries indicating that there might have been settlements in the area as early as the western Han dynasty (206 BC to AD 8 ) to Jin Dynasty (266–420).

The area used to be a Hakka settlement, with about 200 villagers according to Bao'an records in 1819.

The heart of the present-day Mong Kok is along Argyle Street near Sai Yeung Choi Street whilst the proper Mong Kok used to be to the north, near the present-day Mong Kok East station. Mong Kok was an area of cultivated lands, bounded to the south by Argyle Street, to the west by Coronation Road (a section of present-day Nathan Road), and to the east by hills. To the southeast of Mong Kok is Ho Man Tin and to the west Tai Kok Tsui.

On 10 August 2008, the Cornwall Court fire broke out. More than 200 firefighters were involved in the rescue operation. Four people died, including two firefighters.

Mong Kok received a lot of negative media attention for many acid attacks on Sai Yeung Choi Street from December 2008 through January 2010.

The area was the site of protracted demonstrations during the 2014 Hong Kong protests, including the gau wu campaign, and was also the site of the 2016 Mong Kok civil unrest.

Streets and markets

Mong Kok preserves its traditional characteristics with an array of markets, small shops, and food stalls that have disappeared from other areas during the past several decades of economic developments and urban transformation. As such, a few of these streets in Mong Kok have acquired nicknames reflecting their own characteristics. Some interesting sites are:

There are also food stalls selling noodles, seafood, and congee. An open-air market of fruits and vegetables is also located in the vicinity.
 Sai Yeung Choi Street South – A street full of shops selling consumer electronic products, cosmetics, and discount books. The latter are usually located on the lower floors of buildings.
 Yuen Po Street Bird Garden – Hundreds of songbirds in exquisitely crafted cages can be seen at this market. The garden is open from 10 a.m. to 6 p.m. and is located near Mong Kok Stadium, to the north of Mong Kok East station and east of Prince Edward station.
 The garden was completed in 1997 for the relocation of booths selling birds at Hong Lok Street, aka. "Bird Street", which was closed due to urban renewal in June 1998.
 Fa Yuen Street (also known as ) – This is a small neighbourhood of small retailers selling sports equipment and clothing. The shops stock a diversity of sports shoes, including many shoes of rare or special editions from different places.
 Flower Market Road – The street and the nearby side streets are packed with florists and street vendors selling flowers and plants. At the end of the street is Yuen Po Street Bird Garden.
 Goldfish Street or Goldfish Market – Centered on a section of Tung Choi Street, north of Bute Street. There are dozens of shops and hawkers selling tropical freshwater and marine fish, aquariums and accessories. This market opens very early in the morning.
 Tile Street – This is a section of Portland Street near Argyle Street and Bute Street with more than 50 retailers selling materials for construction or renovation, such as tiles, wall paper, window frames and bath tubs.
 Photocopy Street – A neighbourhood near Yim Po Fong Street and Soy Street is noted for its remarkable number of photocopying shops due to the number of schools in the vicinity.
 Portland Street – A red-light district featuring numerous shops and restaurants.
 Kwong Wa Street, between Dundas Street and Yim Po Fong Street, is famous for shops selling airsoft, RC racing, modelling and other hobbying equipment.
 Dundas Street marks the southern end of the shopping area in eastern Mong Kok, where Sai Yeung Choi Street South, Tung Choi Street and Fa Yuen Street terminate. It is named for Henry Dundas, 1st Viscount Melville, former British Home Secretary and Secretary of State for War. It is unclear why the street was bestowed in his honour although, as a former British colony, many of Hong Kong's streets and institutions were named in memory of prominent English historic and political figures. Ho King Shopping Centre, Ka Lok Shopping Arcade and Trendy Zone are major shopping centres on the street. Various kinds of food shops concentrate on this street. Kwong Wah Hospital is also situated on the street. Across Nathan Road, the section in the western Mong Kok is relatively quiet and there are many cafés above street level in several buildings.

Some popular shopping plazas located in this dense area include:

 Sino Centre – Shops sell comic books, VCDs and DVDs related to Japanese cartoons, and regular CD albums. There are also several Japanese style karaoke booths, which can be booked by the hour.
 Ho King Shopping Centre – Visitors can find computer and video games sold for relatively low prices. The fourth floor of the plaza is infamous for being formerly the biggest base of pornographic CDs and DVDs, and activities have diminished due to police and customs operations. However, some shops have been driven to the office section of the building.
 Grand Century Place – Situated next to Mong Kok East station, visitors can find famous-brand and popular shops.
 Mong Kok Computer Centre – This three-story computer mall has around 50 to 70 computer shops, selling laptops, software, hardware and computer accessories.
 Langham Place – This is a 59-storey complex with a shopping mall, a hotel, and offices. It opened in 2004 and was constructed based on the Hong Kong Government urban redevelopment scheme. It is the tallest building in Mong Kok.
Argyle Centre – This usually crowded centre, located next to Mong Kok Station, has three floors of shops selling low-priced clothes and shoes, plastic toys and heavy metal CDs.

Other streets in the area include:
 Bute Street, named after John Stuart, 3rd Earl of Bute, Prime Minister of the United Kingdom between 1762 and 1763. It may also have been named after the Scottish peerage of the same name, following the naming pattern of several other streets in the area.
 Fife Street is a street that is north of Argyle Street, south of Mong Kok Road, and perpendicular to Nathan Road. The Chinese name means "fast wealth" in English, but the name is a loanword based on the English pronunciation of the fife instrument.
 Soy Street

Food 
The Mong Kok area has many food-booths selling traditional snacks such as fish balls, fried beancurd (tofu) and various dim sum. These fingerfoods are very popular in Hong Kong, especially for folks on the run. In addition, there are restaurants serving different kinds of cuisine, ranging from Japanese to Thai to Italian.

Built heritage 

Built heritage in Mong Kok includes:
 Several tong-lau, including Nos. 600–626 Shanghai Street and Lui Seng Chun on Lai Chi Kok Road. Both are listed as Grade I historic buildings.
 Old Kowloon Police Headquarters, built in 1925. Grade II historic building and one of the historic police station buildings in Hong Kong. Now part of the Mong Kok Police Station.
 Shui Yuet Temple (水月宮), located at No. 90 Shantung Street. Built in 1927, it is dedicated to Guanyin. Grade III.
 All Saints' Church, No. 2 Yim Po Fong Street
 Parts of Kowloon Hospital

Sport venues 

 Macpherson Stadium
 Macpherson Playground
 Mong Kok Stadium: home to Citizen AA and Sun Hei SC
 Boundary Street Sports Centre

Education
Educational institutions in Mong Kok include:
 Chinese University of Hong Kong campus in Shantung Street
 Diocesan Boys' School
 Hong Kong & Kowloon Chiu Chow Public Association Secondary School
 Hong Kong College of Engineering
 Queen Elizabeth School
 Sheng Kung Hui All Saints' Middle School

Mong Kok is in Primary One Admission (POA) School Net 32. Within the school net are multiple aided schools (operated independently but funded with government money) and Tong Mei Road Government Primary School (塘尾道官立小學).

Transport

The main thoroughfares are:
 Argyle Street
 Canton Road
 Nathan Road
 Prince Edward Road
 Shanghai Street

Three rail lines serve the area:
 The MTR Tsuen Wan and Kwun Tong lines have two stations in this area: Prince Edward station to the north and Mong Kok station to the south.
 The MTR East Rail line has Mong Kok East station in the eastern part of the area.

Popular culture
Mong Kok was the setting for the 2004 hit film One Night in Mongkok directed by Derek Yee. The movie portrays Mong Kok, one of the most densely populated places on Earth, as a hotbed of illicit activity. Similarly, the district was also the setting of the 1996 film Mongkok Story (旺角風雲) directed by Wilson Yip, which depicts a young man who becomes involved in a triad gang. The 2009 film To Live and Die in Mongkok and the 2013 film Young and Dangerous: Reloaded are also set in Mong Kok. The literal Chinese title of the 1988 film As Tears Go By by Wong Kar-wai is "Mong Kok Carmen". Part of Robert Ludlum's 1986 novel The Bourne Supremacy was set in Mong Kok.

The area is known locally for a youth subculture, the Mong Kok culture.

2014 protests
Mong Kok was one of the main sites of the 2014 Hong Kong protests. Banks, jewellery stores and clothing stores were closed as a result of the pro-democracy protests.

References

External links

 Flickr: Photos tagged with Mongkok
 Photo gallery featuring Flower Market Road over the Chinese New Year.

 
Hakka culture in Hong Kong